The Zimbabwe Museum of Human Sciences, formerly the Queen Victoria Museum, is a museum in Harare, Zimbabwe. The museum contains the seven-hundred-year-old Lemba artifact Ngoma Lungundu, which some believe to be a replica of the Ark of the Covenant. It is the oldest wooden object ever found in sub-Saharan Africa.

Other Information
The "Zimbabwe Museum of Human Sciences" is located at Civic Centre, Rotten Row, CY 33, Causeway, Harare, Zimbabwe. This is in the area known as Harare Central, and is located close to Samora Machel Avenue. According to the Zimbabwe Embassy, The "Zimbabwe Museum of Human Sciences" in Harare houses a library, exhibition galleries, and a model Shona Village, in addition to holding ethnographic and archaeological collections. Wildlife exhibits are on show in public galleries.

References

Museums in Zimbabwe
Buildings and structures in Harare
Science and technology in Zimbabwe
Tourist attractions in Harare